John Fitch may refer to:

 John Fitch (computer scientist) (born 1945), computer scientist, mathematician and composer
 John Fitch (inventor) (1743–1798), early American inventor, built the first steamboat in the United States in 1786
 John Fitch, Massachusetts settler for whom Fitchburg, Massachusetts is named
 John Fitch (racing driver) (1917–2012), racing driver, inventor of innovative safety devices and descendant of John Fitch (inventor)
 John A. Fitch (1881–1959), writer and professor of labor relations
 John H. Fitch, namesake of YMCA Camp Fitch in Springfield, Pennsylvania
 John Knowles Fitch (1880–1943), founder of Fitch Ratings, Ltd
 John Nugent Fitch (1840–1927), botanical illustrator

See also
 Jon Fitch (born 1978), U.S. mixed martial arts fighter